4 Schlüssel is a German crime film directed by Jürgen Roland. It was released in 1966.

Cast
 as Alexander Ford
Walter Rilla as Bankdirektor Eduard Rose
 as Silvia Rose
Hanns Lothar as Richard Hiss
Hellmut Lange as Thilo
Joseph Offenbach as Herr Wohlers
Ida Krottendorf as Margarete Wohlers
Paul Edwin Roth as Konrad von Brenken
Ellen Schwiers as Irene Quinn
 as Jensen
 as Charlie
Heinz Engelmann as Kriminalkommissar

External links
 

1966 films
West German films
1960s German-language films
German crime films
1966 crime films
Films directed by Jürgen Roland
German heist films
1960s heist films
Films set in Hamburg
Films based on German novels
1960s German films